Blair Marshall Tickner (born 13 October 1993) is a New Zealand cricketer who plays for Central Districts. He made his international debut for the New Zealand cricket team in February 2019.

Domestic career
In November 2017, he took at hat-trick in the first innings for Central District's match against Wellington in the 2017–18 Plunket Shield season.

In the 2017–18 Super Smash, he was the leading wicket-taker, with twenty-one dismissals in eleven matches. In June 2018, he was awarded a contract with Central Districts for the 2018–19 season.

International career
In January 2019, he was named in New Zealand's Twenty20 International (T20I) squad for their series against India. He made his T20I debut against India on 10 February 2019. In February 2020, Tickner was called up to New Zealand's One Day International (ODI) squad for the third match against India.

In November 2020, Tickner was named in the New Zealand A cricket team for practice matches against the touring West Indies team. In August 2021, Tickner was named in New Zealand's ODI squad for their tour of Pakistan.

In February 2022, Tickner was named in New Zealand's Test squad for their series against South Africa. The following, Tickner was named in New Zealand's One Day International (ODI) squad for their home series against the Netherlands. He made his ODI debut on 29 March 2022, for New Zealand against the Netherlands.

In May 2022, Tickner was named in New Zealand's Test squad for their tour of England. He made his Test debut on 16 February 2023, for New Zealand against England.

References

External links
 

1993 births
Living people
New Zealand cricketers
New Zealand Test cricketers
New Zealand One Day International cricketers
New Zealand Twenty20 International cricketers
Central Districts cricketers
Cricketers from Napier, New Zealand